Robert Alexander Barel (born 23 December 1957 in Amsterdam) is an athlete from the Netherlands. He competes in triathlon.

Career
Originally a swimmer, Barel competed and won his first triathlon in 1982 (Amsterdam). Won the very first ETU European Championships in 1985 (Immenstadt). Competed in the first ITU World Championships in 1989 (Avignon, 5th place). Won the first ITU Long Distance Championships in 1994 (Nice). Competed in the first Olympic triathlon at the 2000 Summer Olympics. He took forty-third place with a total time of 1:55:36.69 at the age of 42.

Titles 
World Champion Long Distance triathlon: 1994
European Champion Middle Distance triathlon EK: 1986, 1988, 1994
European Champion Olympic distance triathlon: 1985, 1986, 1987, 1988
National Champion Olympic distance triathlon: 1986, 1988, 1989, 1990, 1994, 1998
National Champion duatlon: 1993, 1994, 1997
National Champion cross triathlon: 2005, 2008
European Champion cross triathlon: 2008
National Champion Mountainbike Masters2: 2005, 2006, 2007

Major achievements

References
  Dutch Olympic Committee
  sports-reference

1957 births
Living people
Dutch male triathletes
Duathletes
Dutch mountain bikers
Olympic triathletes of the Netherlands
Triathletes at the 2000 Summer Olympics
Sportspeople from Amsterdam